Une souris chez les hommes , is a French comedy film from 1963, directed by Jacques Poitrenaud, written by Michel Audiard and Francis Ryck, starring Dany Saval and Louis de Funès. The film is known under the titles: "A Mouse with the Men" (International English title), "Un drôle de caïd" (alternative French title), "O Tesouro Oculto" (Portugal), "Bei Oscar ist 'ne Schraube locker" (West Germany), "Due uomini in fuga... per un colpo maldestro" (Italy).

Cast

References

External links 
 
 Une souris chez les hommes at the Films de France
 analyse du film : 

1964 films
French comedy films
1960s French-language films
French black-and-white films
Films directed by Jacques Poitrenaud
Films with screenplays by Michel Audiard
1960s French films